Brigitte Evanno (born September 12, 1952 in France) is a French taekwondo athlete.

Evanno won the bronze medal in the under 60 kg at the 1987 World Taekwondo Championships, the gold medal in the under 60 kg taekwondo at the 1986 European Championships, the gold medal in the under 57 kg taekwondo at the 1982 European Championships and the bronze medal in the under 56 kg at the 1984 European Taekwondo Championships.

References

External links
 

French female taekwondo practitioners
Living people
1952 births
World Taekwondo Championships medalists
European Taekwondo Championships medalists
20th-century French women